Martin Vyrůbalík (born January 29, 1981) is a Czech professional ice hockey defenceman who currently plays with HC Olomouc in the Czech Extraliga.

References

External links

1981 births
Living people
Czech ice hockey defencemen
HC Kometa Brno players
HC Olomouc players
Orli Znojmo players
People from Hodonín
HK 91 Senica players
HK 36 Skalica players
HC Slezan Opava players
VHK Vsetín players
Sportspeople from the South Moravian Region
Czech expatriate ice hockey players in Slovakia